Paranigilgia is a genus of moths in the family Brachodidae.

Species
Paranigilgia aritai Kallies, 1998
Paranigilgia brandti Kallies, 2013
Paranigilgia bushii (Arita, 1980)
Paranigilgia mariannae Kallies, 2013
Paranigilgia morosa (Diakonoff, 1948)

References

 , 1998: A contribution to the knowledge of the Oriental and Australian Brachodidae (Lepidoptera: Sesioidea). Tinea 15 (4): 312–337.
 , 2004: The Brachodidae of the Oriental region and Adjacent territories (Lepidoptera: Sesioidea). Tijdschrift voor Entomologie 147 (1): 1-20.
 , 2013: New and little known Brachodidae from tropical Asia and Papua New Guinea (Lepidoptera, Cossoidea). Zootaxa, 3641 (3): 241–259. Abstract: .

Brachodidae